Palmerella is a genus of plants in the family Campanulaceae. It has only one known species, Palmerella debilis, long known by the synonym Lobelia dunnii. It is native to 8 counties in southern California (San Diego, Orange, Riverside, San Bernardino, Los Angeles, Ventura, Santa Barbara and Monterey) plus the northern part of Baja California.

The oldest name for the plant is Palmerella debilis, coined by Asa Gray in 1876. Greene in 1889 wanted to move the species to the genus Lobelia, but could not use the name Lobelia debilis, because that name had already been used for a different plant by Linnaeus f. in 1782. Hence Greene created the replacement name Lobelia dunnii. More recent publications favor reverting to Gray's older name.

Two subspecies are recognized:
Palmerella debilis subsp. debilis - Baja California
Palmerella debilis subsp. serrata (A.Gray) Lammers - California and Baja California

References

External links 
 
 
 Calflora taxon report, Lobelia dunnii  Greene
 Theodore Payne Foundation for Wild Flowers and Native Plants, California Native Plant Database, Lobelia dunnii var. serrata
 Calphotos, University of California at Berkeley, Photo Database, Lobelia dunnii var. serrata
 Mamba, University of California at Irvine, Campanulaceae of Orange County, California, Lobelia dunnii var. serrata

Lobelioideae
Monotypic Campanulaceae genera
Flora of California
Flora of Baja California